The 1971–72 St. Louis Blues season was the fifth for the franchise in St. Louis, Missouri.  The Blues finished the season in third place in the Western Division, with a record of 28 wins, 39 losses and 11 ties, good for 67 points, placing them in the playoffs, where they defeated the Minnesota North Stars 4–3 in the first round, before losing to the eventual Stanley Cup champion Boston Bruins in four straight in round two.

Offseason

Regular season

Final standings

Schedule and results

Playoffs

Quarterfinals: (W2) Minnesota North Stars vs. (W3) St. Louis Blues

Semifinals: (E1) Boston Bruins vs. (W3) St. Louis Blues

Player statistics

Regular season
Scoring

Goaltending

Playoffs
Scoring

Goaltending

Awards and records

Transactions

Draft picks
The 1971 NHL Amateur Draft was held on June 10, 1971, at the Queen Elizabeth Hotel in Montreal, Quebec, Canada.

Farm teams

See also
1971–72 NHL season

References

External links

St. Louis Blues seasons
St. Louis
St. Louis
St Louis
St Louis